Deepwater Creek is a stream in Henry County in west central Missouri. It is a tributary of the Truman Reservoir.

The stream begins at the confluence of North Deepwater Creek and South Deepwater Creek in western Henry County (at ) east-southeast of the community of Johnstown. The stream flows east-northeast passing under Missouri Route K north of Germantown. The stream is impounded as Montrose Lake within the Montrose Conservation Area. Below the Montrose Dam the stream flows generally east passing south of La Due.

The stream was known as a stream of deep water and the name Deepwater also served as a school, a village post office and township in the vicinity.

References

Rivers of Henry County, Missouri
Rivers of Missouri